Shemiranat County is in Tehran province, Iran. The capital of the county is the city of Shemiran. At the 2006 census, the county's population was 37,778 in 11,178 households. The following census in 2011 counted 44,061 people in 14,227 households. At the 2016 census, the county's population was 47,279 in 16,107 households. (For census purposes, the former cities of Shemiran and Tajrish, sometimes allocated to the county, are counted in the city of Tehran, into which they have been absorbed, not in Shemiranat County.)

Administrative divisions

The population history and structural changes of Shemiranat County's administrative divisions over three consecutive censuses are shown in the following table. The latest census shows two districts, three rural districts, and three cities.

References

 

Counties of Tehran Province